Madla is a former municipality in Rogaland county, Norway.  The  municipality existed from 1930 until 1965 when it was merged into Stavanger Municipality. The small municipality now exists as the borough of Madla inside the city of Stavanger, on the northeast side of the Hafrsfjorden. It was one of the smallest municipalities in Rogaland county, with only four farms: Malde (now spelled Madla), Revheim, and North- and South-Sunde.  The municipal centre was located at Malde, now known as Madlamark.

History
The municipality of Håland was dissolved in 1930 when it was split into two separate municipalities: Sola (southwest of the Hafrsfjorden) and Madla (northeast of the fjord).  Initially, Madla had 1,091 residents. During the 1960s, there were many municipal mergers across Norway due to the work of the Schei Committee. On 1 January 1965, the municipality of Madla was merged with the city of Stavanger and most of the municipality of Hetland.  At the time of the merger, Madla had 6,025 residents.

Government
All municipalities in Norway, including Madla, are responsible for primary education (through 10th grade), outpatient health services, senior citizen services, unemployment and other social services, zoning, economic development, and municipal roads.  The municipality is governed by a municipal council of elected representatives, which in turn elects a mayor.

Municipal council
The municipal council  of Madla was made up of 17 representatives that were elected to four year terms.  The party breakdown of the final municipal council was as follows:

See also
List of former municipalities of Norway

References

Stavanger
Former municipalities of Norway
1930 establishments in Norway
1965 disestablishments in Norway